A VoIP gateway is a gateway device that uses Internet Protocols to transmit and receive voice communications (VoIP).

Setup
A typical VoIP gateway has interfaces to both IP networks and PSTN (Public switched telephone network) or POTS (Plain old telephone service) telephone services. The gateway may be configured to use these in several ways, including:
 An internal telephone instrument or nmnbm , with external game connectivity through VoIP via the Internet.
 The PSTN interface to a telephone network, with IP connectivity to an in-house VoIP phone system.
 Both PSTN and VoIP interfaces externally, sometimes to offer a connection at local call charges to a remote call centre.
The PSTN interface is often either duplicated as, or can act as, connections for both a foreign exchange station (FXS) and a foreign exchange office (FXO). An FXS interface connects to FXO devices, such as local analogue telephone handsets or the exchange side of a PABX. The FXO interface connects  to FXS devices, such as the PSTN.

A relatively potent device is needed to use better compression formats, such as G.729a; a relatively inexpensive and simple device can easily handle a similar function using more bandwidth over G.711.  Any device capable of delivering audio in G.711 via Internet in either way can be considered a VOIP Gateway, but one that is capable of sending and receiving simultaneously will perform better. One with support for more codecs will usually be able to perform better in a range of situations, such as restricted bandwidth, though doing so is not always easy to differentiate. The packets of data are quickly sent (as little as a few milliseconds between packets), most often using User Datagram Protocol (UDP). A lost packet or two will not usually result in any noticeable degradation of the signal.

Using G.711 as the codec, it is possible to use a fax machine or modem via these devices without issues. This is mostly due to G.711 being a relatively simple compression audio stream. Other codecs will not usually perform this task.

Any modern PC with a microphone and speakers (or a headset serving both those tasks) is capable of acting as a VoIP gateway. This still requires an Internet connection and a Session Initiation Protocol (SIP) relay which adds to the disadvantages of VoIP. Most SIP relays are commercial and charge either pay-per-minute or a flat rate for unlimited service on a number of channels.

References

Voice over IP